Brian Schwager (aka Ares Schwager) is an American musician and the guitarist from Rapcore band Downset. The 'Ares' nickname came from his days of playing the Dungeons & Dragons role playing game, where his character was called 'Ares' (also known as the Olympian God of War).

References 

American heavy metal guitarists
Living people
American male guitarists
Year of birth missing (living people)